Toquepala Airport  is a high-elevation airport serving the mining village of Toquepala in the Tacna Region of Peru. The runway has nearby high terrain in all quadrants.

See also

Transport in Peru
List of airports in Peru

References

External links
OpenStreetMap - Toquepala
OurAirports - Toquepala
SkyVector - Toquepala
Toquepala Airport

Airports in Peru
Buildings and structures in Tacna Region